An airbag is a device designed to inflate rapidly in a collision.

Airbag may also refer to:
 Airbag (film), a 1997 Spanish film
 "Airbag", a song from Radiohead's 1997 album OK Computer
 Airbag / How Am I Driving?, a 1998 Radiohead EP
 Airbag (Argentine band), an Argentine hard-rock band
 Airbag (Norwegian band), a Norwegian progressive rock back
 Mozilla Airbag, crash reporting software

See also
 Air bag vest, worn by motorcyclists and equestrian competitors
 BigAirBAG, a brand of cushion used to improve safety at snow sport competitions
 Air suspension for vehicles, initially referred to as airbags
 Blobbing, a pastime involving the use large air bags as water trampolines
 Pneumatic lifting bag, an inflatable air bag used to lift heavy objects